Shanti may refer to:

In Sanskrit
 Inner peace, a state of being mentally and spiritually at peace, with enough knowledge and understanding to keep oneself strong in the face of discord or stress
 Kshanti, one of the paramitas of Buddhism
 Shanti Mantras or "Peace Mantras”, Hindu prayers or sacred utterances believed by practitioners to have religious, magical or spiritual powers

People

Real
 Shanti Devi (1926–1987), Indian woman at the center of a case of supposed reincarnation
 Shanti Devi (politician) (born 1937), Indian politician
 Shanti Roney (born 1970), Swedish actor
 Shanti Snyder (born 1981), Japanese/English lyricist, singer, songwriter, and music TV host
 Oliver Shanti (born 1948), New Age musician
 Shanti Wintergate, musician/actress/writer
 Shanthi Krishna (born 1960), Tamil and Malayalam movie actress
 Shanthi Lekha or Rita Irene Quyn (1929–2009), Sri Lankan actress
 Santhi Soundarajan or Santhi Soundararajan (born 1981), Indian athlete
 Princess Shanti Singh of Nepal (1940–2001), princess of Nepal and rani of Bajhang
 Chaikra Shanti Maximus, Belgian fashion model

Fictional
 A protagonists of Bankim Chandra Chatterjee's 1882 novel Anandamath
 A character in the 2003 Disney cartoon The Jungle Book 2 (2003)

Music
 Shanti (band), an Indian-American group of the early 1970s
 Shanti People, a band that mixes electronic dance music with Vedic mantras
 Shanti (Hitomi Shimatani album), 2002
 Shanti (Aiko Kitahara album), 2007
 "Shanti" (song), a 2002 single by Hitomi Shimatani
 :Shanti / Ashtangi", a 1998 song by Madonna from the album Ray of Light
 "Shanti Shanti Shanti", a song by Babymetal from the 2019 album Metal Galaxy
 "Shanti", a song by Ferry Corsten from the 2008 album Twice in a Blue Moon
 "Shanti", a song by Banco de Gaia from the 1994 album Maya
 Béla Fleck/Jeff Coffin composition from the 1998 album Left of Cool
 "Om Shanti" a song by Alice Coltrane from the 1987 album Divine Songs
”Shanti” a song by Don Cherry from the 1977 album Hear & Now. The song also appears as “Om Shanti Om” on the 2020 album by the same name
 “Shanti” a song by Lexie Liu on her 2022 album The Happy Star

In the media
 Shanti (TV series), a 1994 Indian television series
 Shanti Shanti Shanti, a 1998 Kannada language film
 Shanti (film), a 2004 Indian film starring Bhavana
 An important term in the 2006 film Children of Men

Other uses
 Shantinatha, 16th Jain Tirthankara
 Shanti Project, a group providing support and guidance for people with life-threatening illnesses
 Shanthi Nagar or Shanthi Nagar Colony, a colony of Nalgonda, Andhra Pradesh 
 Shanti Stupa, Ladakh, Jammu and Kashmir, India
 Shanti Theatre, a movie theatre in Chennai, Tamil Nadu
Shanti Anantam Ashram, founded by Swamini Alice Coltrane Turiyasangitananda where she served as spiritual director

See also
 "Shantih shantih shantih", a well-known phrase in the final line of T.S. Eliot's poem "The Waste Land"
 Santi (disambiguation)
 Shanty (disambiguation)